The 1911 Cornell Big Red football team was an American football team that represented Cornell University during the 1911 college football season.  In their second season under head coach Daniel A. Reed, the Big Red compiled a 7–3 record and outscored all opponents by a combined total of 101 to 52. Tackle William Edward Munk was selected by Walter Camp as a second-team player, and by Baseball Magazine as a first-team player, on the 1911 College Football All-America Team.

Schedule

References

Cornell
Cornell Big Red football seasons
Cornell Big Red football